Adduono is an Italian surname. Notable people with the surname include:

 Jeremy Adduono (born 1978), Canadian ice hockey, Bridgeport Sound Tigers player
 Ray Adduono (born 1947), Canadian ice hockey centre
 Rick Adduono (born 1955), Canadian ice hockey, Atlanta Flames player

Italian-language surnames